Melvin Angelstad (born October 31, 1971) is a Canadian former professional ice hockey player. He played two games in the National Hockey League with the Washington Capitals during the 2003–04 NHL season to become the first player to wear #69 in a regular season game. Andrew Desjardins later joined him in this distinction, who donned the number while skating for the San Jose Sharks.

For Angelstad, the road to the NHL was a long one. He played five Colonial Hockey League seasons in Thunder Bay before becoming an IHL regular and then AHL regular.

While in Thunder Bay he played for the Thunder Bay Thunder Hawks (later the Senators and Thunder Cats), wearing number 27, and spawning several bootlegged video collections of his fights.

During the 2003–04 NHL season Angelstad appeared in two games with the Washington Capitals, registering a total of zero points and two penalty minutes. Angelstad has the distinction of being the first player in NHL history to wear sweater #69 in a regular season game.

He now works as a firefighter in the Fort McMurray, Alberta area. He made a cameo appearance in the film Goon: Last of the Enforcers, in which he fights main character Doug Glatt (portrayed by Seann William Scott).

Career statistics

References

External links

1971 births
Adelaide Avalanche players
Belfast Giants players
Canadian ice hockey left wingers
Fort Worth Brahmas players
Sportspeople from Saskatoon
Kalamazoo Wings (1974–2000) players
Las Vegas Thunder players
Living people
Manitoba Moose (IHL) players
Motor City Mechanics players
Nashville Knights players
Newcastle Vipers players
Orlando Solar Bears (IHL) players
Phoenix Roadrunners (IHL) players
Portland Pirates players
Prince Edward Island Senators players
Thunder Bay Senators players
Thunder Bay Thunder Cats (CoHL) players
Thunder Bay Thunder Hawks players
Undrafted National Hockey League players
Washington Capitals players
Ice hockey people from Saskatchewan
New Jersey Rockin' Rollers players
Canadian expatriate ice hockey players in England
Canadian expatriate ice hockey players in Northern Ireland
Canadian expatriate ice hockey players in Australia
Canadian expatriate ice hockey players in the United States